The southern Atlantic tree-rat (Phyllomys sulinus) is a species of spiny rat from South America, described in 2008. It is found in the subtropical region of southern Brazil, from the states of São Paulo to Rio Grande do Sul.

The etymology of the species name derives from the Portuguese word , meaning "south", and pertains to its southern geographic range.

References 

Phyllomys
Mammals described in 2008